Calliprason is a longhorn beetle genus in the subfamily Cerambycinae.

Species
 Calliprason costifer
 Calliprason elegans
 Calliprason marginatum
 Calliprason pallidum
 Calliprason sinclairi

References

External links

Stenoderini